Mehdi Fat'hi  (December 17, 1939 — March 20, 2004)
Mehdi Fat'hi  began his stage career in the Anahita studio in 1959.  He studied acting under Mostafa Oskooyi (Konstantin Stanislavski's 'system'). He made his screen debut in Zan-e khoon-asham (1967). He also directed a drama by name of Sousangerd.

Filmography
	Zan-e khoon-asham directed by Mostafa Oskooyi (1967)
	Tohfeha directed by Ebrahim Vahidzade (1988)
	Kashtee-ye Angelica directed by Muhammad Bozorgnia (1989)
	Dokhtarak-e kenar-e mordab directed by Ali Zhekan (1989)
	Dastmozd directed by Majid Javanmard (1989)
	Kakoli directed by Feryal Behzad (1990)
	Shans-e zendegi directed by Shahriar Parsipoor (1991)
	Avinar directed by Shahram Assadi (1991)
	The Fateful Day directed by Shahram Asadi (1994)
	Zinat directed by Ebrahim Mokhtari (1994)
	Ruz-e vagh'e directed by Shahram Assadi (1995)
	Eteraz (Protest) directed by Masoud Kimiai (2000)
       Azizam man kook nistam (Honey, I am not winded) directed by Mohammad Reza Honarmand (2002)

References 
 
 www.iranact.com
  www.sourehcinema.com

1939 births
2004 deaths
Male actors from Tehran
Iranian male film actors
Iranian male television actors